Charlotte Machmer (born 13 August 1905, date of death unknown) was an Austrian sprinter. She competed in the women's 100 metres at the 1936 Summer Olympics.

References

External links
 

1905 births
Year of death missing
Athletes (track and field) at the 1936 Summer Olympics
Austrian female sprinters
Olympic athletes of Austria
Place of birth missing
Olympic female sprinters